Nikodimos Anagnostou (Greek: Νικόδημος Αναγνώστου) was born on September 7, 1931 in Lisvorio, Mytilene and died in Arnaia on September 16, 2012. was the Greek Orthodox bishop of Ierissos, Greece from 1981 to 2012.

Early life
He graduated with honors from the Theological School of Halki in 1955, and in the same year he was ordained a Deacon and then an Presbyter in the Theological School of Halki by the Headmaster of the School, Bishop of Konya, Iakovos.

Notes

Bishops of the Ecumenical Patriarchate of Constantinople
1931 births
2012 deaths
People from Lesbos
Eastern Orthodox bishops in Greece